The Ynys Môn by-election 2013 is a by-election that was held for the Welsh Assembly constituency of Ynys Môn on Thursday 1 August 2013, following the resignation on 20 June 2013 of its sitting Assembly Member, Ieuan Wyn Jones.

The election was the third Assembly by-election to be held since its formation in 1999, and the first for over seven years (the previous contest being at Blaenau Gwent in June 2006).

Prior to the by-election, the governing Labour Party held exactly half the Assembly seats, meaning a gain for that party (who have held the equivalent seat in the House of Commons since 2001) would have given the Welsh government a two-seat majority.

Election

Six candidates were nominated for the election.

Previous result

References

By-elections to the Senedd
2013 elections in the United Kingdom
2013 in Wales
2010s elections in Wales
History of Anglesey
Politics of Anglesey